Huntingdon Furnace is a national historic district and historic iron furnace and associated buildings located at Franklin Township in Huntingdon County, Pennsylvania. It consists of seven contributing buildings and one contributing structure.  They are the iron furnace, office building, the ironmaster's mansion, log worker's house, a residence, the farm manager's residence, the grist mill and the miller's house. The iron furnace was moved to this site in 1805, from its original site one mile upstream.  It measures 30 feet square by 30 feet high. The ironmaster's mansion was built in 1851, and is a 2 1/2-story, "L"-shaped frame dwelling.   The grist mill dates to 1808, and is a 3 1/2-story, rubble stone building measuring 50 feet by 45 feet.  The furnace was in operation from 1796, until it ceased operations in the 1880s.

It was listed on the National Register of Historic Places in 1990.

References

External links

Industrial buildings and structures on the National Register of Historic Places in Pennsylvania
Historic American Engineering Record in Pennsylvania
Historic districts on the National Register of Historic Places in Pennsylvania
Industrial buildings completed in 1805
Buildings and structures in Huntingdon County, Pennsylvania
Ironworks and steel mills in Pennsylvania
Industrial furnaces
1805 establishments in Pennsylvania
National Register of Historic Places in Huntingdon County, Pennsylvania